Ijaz Ahmed (born 19 September 1957) is a Pakistani former first-class cricketer who played for Lahore cricket team. Later he was an umpire and stood in matches in the 2008–09 RBS Twenty-20 Cup.

References

External links
 

1957 births
Living people
Pakistani cricketers
Pakistani cricket umpires
Lahore cricketers
Cricketers from Lahore